Nately Scures is a small village and former civil parish, now in the parish of Newnham in the Basingstoke and Deane district of Hampshire, England. In 1931 the parish had a population of 288.

Governance
The village of Nately Scures is part of the civil parish of Newnham and is part of the Basing ward of Basingstoke and Deane borough council. The borough council is a Non-metropolitan district of Hampshire County Council.

Religious sites
St. Swithun's was built of flint and rubble around 1175. It is considered to be the best largely unspoilt example of a Norman single-cell apsidal church in England.

Etymology
Hampshire Notes and Queries, Repr. from the Winchester Observer gives the name as meaning 'cattle field'. It is derived from the Anglo Saxon neat ('cattle' or 'beast'). Scures is from Anglo Saxon scua ('wood' or 'shade'). It is seen as Netlescures in 1413.

References

Villages in Hampshire
Former civil parishes in Hampshire
Basingstoke and Deane